Nemophora laurella is a moth of the Adelidae family. It is found in Victoria.

Meyrick stated that it frequented the flowers of Bursaria spinosa.

External links
Australian Faunal Directory

Moths of Australia
Adelidae
Moths described in 1856
Taxa named by Edward Newman